The 2023 Hockey East Men's Ice Hockey Tournament was the 38th edition of the Hockey East Tournament. It was played between March 8 and March 18, 2023. As the tournament champions, the Boston University Terriers received the conference's automatic bid into the 2023 NCAA Division I Men's Ice Hockey Tournament.

Format
The tournament includes all eleven teams in the conference, with teams ranked according to their finish in the conference standings. Seeds 1–5 earn a bye into the quarterfinal round, while seeds 6–11 play to determine the remaining quarterfinalists. Winners in the opening round are reseeded and advanced to play top three seeds in reverse order. Winners of the quarterfinal matches are again reseeded for the semifinal, and the winners of those two games face off in the championship.

All series are single-elimination with opening round and quarterfinal matches occurring at home team sites. The two semifinal games and championship match are held at the TD Garden. The tournament champion receives an automatic bid into the NCAA Division I Men's Ice Hockey Tournament.

Standings

Bracket
Teams are reseeded after the Opening Round and Quarterfinals

Note: * denotes overtime period(s)

Results

Opening Round

(6) Maine vs. (11) Vermont

(7) Providence vs. (10) New Hampshire

(8) Boston College vs. (9) Massachusetts

Quarterfinals

(1) Boston University vs. (11) Vermont

(2) Merrimack vs. (8) Boston College

(3) Northeastern vs. (7) Providence

(4) Connecticut vs. (5) Massachusetts Lowell

Semifinals

(1) Boston University vs. (7) Providence

(2) Merrimack vs. (5) Massachusetts Lowell

Championship

(1) Boston University vs. (2) Merrimack

Tournament Awards

All-Tournament Team
Goaltender – Drew Commesso, Boston University
Defenceman – Lane Hutson, Boston University
Defenceman – Christian Felton, Merrimack
Forward – Matt Copponi, Merrimack
Forward – Devin Kaplan, Boston University
Forward – Dylan Peterson, Boston University

Tournament MVP
Lane Hutson, Boston University

References

External links
2023 Hockey East Men's Ice Hockey Tournament

Hockey East Men's Ice Hockey Tournament
Hockey East Men's Ice Hockey Tournament
College sports tournaments in Massachusetts
Ice hockey competitions in Boston
Hockey East Men's Ice Hockey Tournament
Hockey East Men's Ice Hockey Tournament
Hockey East Men's Ice Hockey Tournament